Turtle Mound is a prehistoric archaeological site located  south of New Smyrna Beach, Florida, on State Road A1A. On September 29, 1970, it was added to the U.S. National Register of Historic Places. Because it is visible seven miles out at sea, early Spanish explorers and subsequent mariners used the large mound as a landmark for coastal navigation. Today, the site is owned and managed by the National Park Service as part of Canaveral National Seashore.

The turtle-shaped mound contains oysters and refuse from the prehistoric Timucuan people, who caught a variety of small mammals and reptiles here. Archaeologists believe that these people may have used this site as a high-ground refuge during hurricanes. It has been estimated to have been constructed between 800 and 1400 CE; recent radio-carbon dating has dated it toaround 1000 BCE.

The Timucuan experienced greater competitive forces for finite resources such as arable land resulting in increased open conflict.  This is apparent in some of the material found in the Turtle Mound location where it occupied an important location along the coast. Archaeologists have recently found 1,200-year-old pottery on the site.

Characteristics
The shell mound is a deposit of refuse composed mostly of oyster shells, but no extensive excavations have been made. The mound contains several species of tropical plants. Surveys have confirmed the presence of Amyris elemifera, Heliotropium angiospermum, Plumbago scandens, Harrisia fragrans, Sideroxylon foetidissimum, Schoepfia chrysophylloides, and other species. The site represents the northernmost distribution for several species. The heat retention of shells and the proximity to the Atlantic Ocean maintains warmer temperatures than surrounding areas.

History

Currently called Turtle Mound, it has had several names throughout history including Surruque in the 16th century, named after the cacique (chief) and Indian tribe that lived in the area, Mount Belvedere (1769), The Rock (1769), Mount Tucker (1796), and Turtle Mount (1823).  In 1605, the Spanish explorer Alvaro Mexia visited the site and reported natives launching their dugout canoes at the mound's base. Over many years of this practice, the mound began to take the form of a turtle, giving the feature its name.

Gallery

References

External links

 Volusia County listings at National Register of Historic Places: Turtle Mound 
 Volusia County listings at Florida's Office of Cultural and Historical Programs - Turtle Mound 

Shell middens in Florida
Woodland period
Native American history of Florida
Archaeological sites in Florida
Archaeological sites on the National Register of Historic Places in Florida
National Register of Historic Places in Volusia County, Florida
Protected areas of Volusia County, Florida
Mounds in Florida
Florida Native American Heritage Trail
Timucua